USS Minneopa (SP-1701) was a United States Navy patrol vessel in service from 1917 to 1918.

Minneopa was built as a private motorboat of the same name in 1902. On 9 October 1917, the U.S. Navy acquired her from her owner, S. E. Patterson, for use as a section patrol boat during World War I. She was placed in service as USS Minneopa (SP-1701).

Minneopa was returned to Paterson sometime in 1918.

References
 
 SP-1701 Minneopa at Department of the Navy Naval History and Heritage Command Online Library of Selected Images: U.S. Navy Ships -- Listed by Hull Number: "SP" #s and "ID" #s -- World War I Era Patrol Vessels and other Acquired Ships and Craft numbered from ID # 1700 through ID # 1799
 NavSource Online: Section Patrol Craft Photo Archive Minneopa (SP 1701)

Patrol vessels of the United States Navy
World War I patrol vessels of the United States
1902 ships